The Roman Catholic Diocese of Naviraí is a diocese located in the city of Naviraí in the Ecclesiastical province of Campo Grande in Brazil.

History
 1 June 2011: Established as Diocese of Naviraí from Diocese of Dourados

Bishops
 Ettore Dotti,  (1 June 2011 – present)

References

External links
 GCatholic.org
 Catholic Hierarchy

Roman Catholic dioceses in Brazil
Christian organizations established in 2011
Navirai, Roman Catholic Diocese of
Roman Catholic dioceses and prelatures established in the 21st century